Punalur is a Municipality in Kollam district of Kerala State in India. It is the headquarter of the Punalur Taluk and Punalur Revenue Division. It's situated in the eastern part of Kollam district of Kerala, on the banks of the Kallada River and foothills of the western ghats.

Geography 

Many tourists have visited scenic spots along the Kallada River. The first planned eco-tourism project in Kerala is only  from Punalur on NH 744 towards Sengottai.

Politics 
Punalur Assembly constituency is part of the Kollam (Lok Sabha constituency). P.S.Supal is the MLA of Punalur assembly constituency.  N. K. Premachandran is MP of Kollam (Lok Sabha constituency).

Climate

Demographics 
 India census, Punalur had a population of 46,702. Males constitute 49% of the population and females 51%. Punalur has an average literacy rate of 84%, higher than the national average of 59.5%: male literacy is 85%, and female literacy is 82%. In Punalur, 10% of the population is under 6 years of age. Sree Bharanikavu Devi Temple is a Hindu temple located here.

Punalur Paper Mill 
It is believed that the oldest paper mill in the country was started at Punalur in 1886. The mill used reeds to make paper and was opened by T.J. Cameroon, an industrialist from Britain. One of the mill's customers when they were open was the India Security Press. Up to 1931, Punalur was renamed multiple times. In 1987, the mill which was managed by L.N. Dalmia and had around 1020 employees was shut down due to huge liabilities.

Notable people 
 Punalur Balan (1927–1987)
 Lalithambika Antharjanam (1909–1987)
 M. J. Radhakrishnan Cinematographer

Media 
 Punalur News
 Voice Of Punalur Media™
 Punaloor History

Educational institutions

Colleges 
 Sree Narayana College, Punalur

References

External links 

 Punalur Local News
 All Information About Punalur
 

Cities and towns in Kollam district